The 2013–14 Ukrainian First League was the 23rd since its establishment. The competition commenced on 14 July 2013. Due to sponsorship reasons the league was called Favbet League 1. The competition had a winter break that started on 30 November 2013 and resumed on 28 March 2014. The completion concluded on 31 May 2014.

Promotion and relegation

Promoted teams

Group 1
Desna Chernihiv – Second League champion (returning after an absence of 3 seasons)
Nyva Ternopil – Promotion/relegation play-off winner (returning after an absence of 3 seasons)

Group 2
UkrAhroKom Holovkivka – Second League (debut)

Relegated teams 
No teams were relegated from the 2012–13 Ukrainian Premier League.

Originally Hoverla Uzhhorod and Metalurh Zaporizhya were to be relegated from the Ukrainian Premier League after finishing in 15th and 16th places. However, Kryvbas Kryvyi Rih failed attestation and their license was withdrawn by the Ukrainian Premier League. Number of clubs refused promotion leaving two vacant positions in the 2013–14 Ukrainian Premier League which were awarded to the relegating clubs.

Team reduction
The competition was reduced by two teams to sixteen at the PFL Conference on 26 June 2013. Krymteplytsia Molodizhne withdrew from the PFL after the previous season and Shakhtar Sverdlovsk bid for promotion was refused.

Location map 

The following displays the location of teams.

Stadiums 

The following stadiums are considered home grounds for the teams in the competition.

Managers

Managerial changes

League table

Results

Positions by round
The following table represents the teams position after each round in the competition.

Top goalscorers

See also
 2013–14 Ukrainian Premier League
 2013–14 Ukrainian Second League
 2013–14 Ukrainian Cup

References

External links
  РЕГЛАМЕНТ Всеукраїнських змагань з футболу серед команд клубів Професіональної футбольної ліги сезону 2013 – 2014 років (Regulation of the All-Ukrainian competitions in football among teams of the Professional Football League clubs in the season 2013–14). Professional Football League of Ukraine website.

Ukrainian First League seasons
2013–14 in Ukrainian association football leagues
UK